Berkeh-ye Mah Banu (also Romanized as Berkeh-ye Māh Bānū) is a village in Howmeh Rural District, in the Central District of Lamerd County, Fars Province, Iran. At the 2006 census, its population was 42, in 8 families.

References 

Populated places in Lamerd County